The 1912 TCU football team represented Texas Christian University (TCU) as a member of the Texas Intercollegiate Athletic Association (TIAA) during the 1912 college football season. The Horned Frogs finished the season 8–1 overall. Led by Willis T. Stewart in his first and only year as head coach, TCU compiled an overall record of 8–1. They played their home games at Morris Park in Fort Worth, Texas. The team's captain was Bryan F. Ware, who played guard.

Schedule

References

TCU
TCU Horned Frogs football seasons
TCU football